Tonghai County is located in Yuxi Prefecture-level City, Yunnan Province, China.

Geography

Tonghai County occupies the fertile valley of Qilu Lake, surrounded on all sides by mountains. The county seat is located on the south side of the lake, separated from the lake by a mile-wide strip of farmland.

The county's southernmost part, including the Dagao Dai and Yi Ethnic Township and Lishan Yi Ethnic Township, is separated from the rest of the county by mountains; it is outside of the Qilu Lake basin, and is drained into the Qu River instead.

In 1970, a powerful earthquake struck the area.

History
The area around Qilu Lake has been inhabited since at least the Neolithic period. In the Tang dynasty it was the base of a general. For many centuries it was the political, economic and military center of southern Yunnan.

Soon after the formation of PRC, the area of today's Tonghai County was organized as two counties: Tonghai and Hexi (in the western part of today's Tonghai County). The two counties were merged into Qilu County on November 22, 1956. On October 22, 1959, Qilu County was renamed Tonghai County.

The county includes a large Muslim (Hui) population. Centers of Hui culture include Dahui and Xiaohui villages in Hexi Township, as well as Nagu Town, with its Najiaying Mosque.

Xingmeng Mongol Ethnic Township, home to the Yunnan Mongols (Khatso), is the only Mongol ethnic township in Yunnan.

Administrative divisions
Tonghai County has 2 subdistricts, 4 towns and 3 ethnic townships. 
2 subdistricts
 Xiushan
 Jiulong
4 towns

3 ethnic townships
 Lishan Yi
 Gaoda Dai and Yi
 Xingmeng Mongol

Transportation

Bus routes:
Jianshui County (2hr)
Gejiu (2hr)
Hekou (13hr)
Kaiyuan (4hr)
Kunming (2hr)
Railway:
 Yuxi–Mengzi Railway (a section of the standard gauge Kunming–Hekou Railway). The passenger station, Tonghai Station, is located near Hexi Town, a few kilometers west of the county seat.

Climate

References

External links

Tonghai County Official Website

County-level divisions of Yuxi